Bugwisan (부귀산 / 富貴山) is a mountain in Jeollabuk-do, western South Korea.

See also
List of mountains of Korea

References

Mountains of South Korea
Mountains of North Jeolla Province